The March Music Days (Martenski Muzikalni Dni) is a festival, held annually for two weeks in the second half of March in Rousse, Bulgaria, which attracts many elite musicians.

The festival was established in 1961 as an initiative within the frames of the Bulgarian-German cultural cooperation, and is hosted by the Municipality of Rousse. Along its history the music event engaged a wide circle of national and international institutions, such as the Bulgarian Ministry of Culture, the Union of the Bulgarian composers, Bulgarian National Radio, Bulgarian National Television, and more recently British Council, Goethe Institute, Gaudeamus Foundation – the Netherlands, Pro Helvetia, Hungarian Cultural Institute, the Embassy of Austria in Bulgaria, and the Institut Francais – Sofia among others.

The festival has hosted a number of premieres, opuses specifically composed for it, and remarkable visits, one of the most memorable being Dmitri Shostakovich's visit in 1965, when the premiere of Katerina Ismailova was staged by the Rousse State Opera.

Notes

External links 
 Home page
 All programmes since 1961.

Music festivals established in 1961 

Ruse, Bulgaria
Classical music festivals in Bulgaria
Music festivals in Bulgaria
Tourist attractions in Ruse Province
1961 establishments in Bulgaria
Spring (season) events in Bulgaria